The 2020–21 Danish Cup, also known as Sydbank Pokalen, was the 67th season of the Danish Cup competition.

Randers defeated SønderjyskE in the final of the competition on 13 May 2021. As the winner of the tournament, Randers earned qualification into the play-off round of the 2021–22 UEFA Europa League.

Structure
Assuming a similar structure to 2019–20, 92 teams are expected to participate in the first round, coming from all levels of competition. Six additional teams joined in the second round, while the top six teams from the 2019–20 Danish Superliga entered in the third round.

Notable Dates
The draw date and matchdays for the 2020–21 Sydbank Pokalen are as follows:
First round – 1-3 September 2020
Second round – 6-8 October 2020
Third round – 10-12 November 2020
Fourth round – 15-17 December 2020
Quarter-finals – 9-11 February 2021
Semi-finals – 14-15 April 2021
Final – 13 May 2021

Participants
104 teams will compete for the Danish Cup. All teams from the top three divisions in 2019–20 were automatically entered, while 54 teams from lower division teams qualified through qualifying matches to enter the competition proper.

First round
In the first round of the tournament, all teams except those from the 2020–21 Danish Superliga participated, meaning 92 teams took part in this round.

The draw was held on Friday, 2 July 2020.

Second round
The draw was held on 4 September 2020.

There were 52 teams:

 46 teams from the 1st round (winners)
 5 teams from the 2019–20 Danish Superliga (7th–11th placed)
 The 2019–20 Danish 1st Division champions

Third round
The draw was held on 8 October 2020.

There were 32 teams:

 26 teams from the 2nd round (winners)
 6 teams from the 2019–20 Danish Superliga (1st–6th placed)

Fourth round
The draw was held on 12 November 2020.

Quarter-finals
The draw was held on 17 December 2020. Contrary to previous years, the quarter-finals were played over two legs.

AGF won 4–3 on aggregate.

SønderjyskE won 6–2 on aggregate.

Randers won 3–1 on aggregate.

Midtjylland won 5–1 on aggregate.

Semi-finals
The draw was held on 11 March 2021. Contrary to previous years, the semi-finals will be played over two legs.

SønderjyskE won 3–2 on aggregate.

Randers won 3–1 on aggregate.

Final

References

External links
Danish Cup 2019/2020 summary(SOCCERWAY)
Danish Cup 2019/2020 summary (in danish) (DBU)

2020–21
2020–21 European domestic association football cups
Cup